Vorkuta Sovetskiy (also known as Vorkuta East) is a military airfield in the Komi Republic, Russia, located 11 km east of Vorkuta. It was one of nine Air Army staging bases in the Arctic for Russian bomber units. It contains one of the largest runways in Russia's Arctic region.

Sovetskiy was built in the early 1960s as a staging base for intercontinental Long-Range Aviation bomber strikes (as a so-called 'bounce' airdrome).  The airfield was first identified by Western intelligence in 1961. It is maintained by OGA (Arctic Control Group).  The 364 OSAE (364h Independent Mixed Aviation Squadron) was based here between 1980 and 1994 with the Antonov An-12 (NATO: Cub), Antonov An-26 (NATO: Curl) and Mil Mi-8 (NATO: Hip).

See also
 Chekurovka, abandoned Arctic staging base
 Aspidnoye (air base), abandoned Arctic staging base
 Tiksi West, abandoned Arctic staging base

References

Russian Air Force bases
Airports in the Komi Republic
Populated places of Arctic Russia
Soviet Long Range Aviation Arctic staging bases